The following is a list of most watched United States television broadcasts of 1982.

Most watched by week

References

Most watched 1982